The 2015 Northern Ontario Scotties Tournament of Hearts was held from January 15 to 18 at the Fort William Curling Club in Thunder Bay, Ontario. The winning team of Tracy Horgan represented Northern Ontario at the 2015 Scotties Tournament of Hearts in Moose Jaw, Saskatchewan. The event marked the first year that Northern Ontario had a direct entry to the national Scotties bonspiel. Before 2015, the top four teams qualified for the Ontario Scotties Tournament of Hearts.

Teams

Standings

Scores

Draw 1
Thursday, January 15, 10:00AM EST

Draw 2
Thursday, January 15, 4:00PM EST

Draw 3
Friday, January 16, 12:00PM EST

Draw 4
Friday, January 16, 8:00PM EST

Draw 5
Saturday, January 17, 9:30AM EST

Final
Saturday, January 17, 8:00PM EST

References

External links
CurlingZone Coverage

Curling in Northern Ontario
Northern Ontario Scotties Tournament of Hearts
Ontario Scotties Tournament of Hearts
Northern Ontario Scotties Tournament of Hearts
Northern Ontario Scotties Tournament of Hearts
Sports competitions in Thunder Bay
Northern Ontario Scotties Tournament of Hearts